The northern celestial hemisphere, also called the Northern Sky, is the northern half of the celestial sphere; that is, it lies north of the celestial equator. This arbitrary sphere appears to rotate westward around a polar axis due to Earth's rotation.

At any given time, the entire Northern Sky is visible from the geographic North Pole, while less of the hemisphere is visible the further south the observer is located. The southern counterpart is the southern celestial hemisphere.

Astronomy
In the context of astronomical discussions or writing about celestial cartography, this celestial hemisphere may also simply then be referred to as the Northern Hemisphere.

For celestial mapping, astronomers may conceive the sky like the inside of a sphere divided into two halves by the celestial equator. The Northern Sky or Northern Hemisphere is therefore the half of the celestial sphere that is north of the celestial equator.

Even if this geocentric model is the ideal projection of the terrestrial equator onto the imaginary celestial sphere, the northern and southern celestial hemispheres are not to be confused with descriptions of the terrestrial hemispheres of Earth itself.

See also
 Southern celestial hemisphere

Astronomical coordinate systems
Hemispheres